Ako, Ikaw...Magkaagaw is a 1980 drama film directed by Danilo Cabrera starring  Alma Moreno, Tet Antiquiera, Mat Ranillo III, Vic Sotto, and Olivia Cenizal. This was Vic Sotto's first and only drama movie.

Cast

Alma Moreno
Tet Antiquiera
Mat Ranillo III
Vic Sotto as Jerico
Olivia Cenizal

External links
 

1980 drama films
1980 films
Philippine romantic drama films
1980s Tagalog-language films
Films set in Metro Manila